Le Cordon Bleu College of Culinary Arts Las Vegas was a culinary school founded in 2003 and owned by Career Education Corporation under a licensing agreement with Le Cordon Bleu in Paris. The school was accredited by the Accrediting Commission of Career Schools and Colleges of Technology (ACCSCT). In Las Vegas, Nevada, the school offered an Associate of Occupational Science degree in Le Cordon Bleu Culinary Arts and a Certificate in Le Cordon Bleu Pâtisserie and Baking.

Le Cordon Bleu College of Culinary Arts was designed to bring the study and practice of culinary arts to Las Vegas. The school was founded in 2003. Le Cordon Bleu Las Vegas stopped accepting applications as of April 2016. All US Cordon Bleu College locations were scheduled to close in 2017.

Academics 
Le Cordon Bleu Culinary Arts Program
Le Cordon Bleu Pâtisserie and Baking Program

Campus 
Housing, public transportation and nearby shopping malls allowed the students to live, commute and work nearby.
Campus facilities included:
Classrooms, instructional kitchens and lecture rooms. 
Student-staffed restaurant.
Computer labs equipped with Internet-ready computers 
Library

Café Bleu
Café Bleu, opened in 2004, was a student-staffed restaurant in connection with Le Cordon Bleu College of Culinary Arts Las Vegas. The restaurant offered American, French and Italian cuisine.

References 

Cooking schools in the United States
Defunct private universities and colleges in Nevada
Buildings and structures in Las Vegas
Universities and colleges in Clark County, Nevada
Career Education Corporation
Educational institutions established in 2003
Educational institutions disestablished in 2017
2003 establishments in Nevada
2017 disestablishments in Nevada